Modou is an African masculine given name that may refer to
Modou Bamba Gaye, Gambian politician 
Modou Barrow (born 1992), Gambian football player
Kabba-Modou Cham (born 1992), Belgian-born Gambian football player 
Modou Dia (born 1950), Senegalese politician and diplomat 
Modou Diagne (born 1994), Senegalese football player
Modou Jadama (born 1994), American association football player of Gambian descent 
Modou Jagne (born 1983), Gambian association football player
Pa Modou Jagne (born 1989), Gambian association football player
Pa-Modou Kah (born 1980), Norwegian football coach and former player
Modou Kouta, Chadian football player and manager
Modou Sady Diagne (born 1954), Senegalese basketball player 
Modou Sougou (born 1984), Senegalese football player
Modou Sowe (born 1963), Gambian football referee 
Modou Tall (born 1953), Senegalese basketball player